Forsmark is a village with 59 inhabitants on the east coast of Uppland, Sweden. It is best known as the location of the Forsmark Nuclear Power Plant.

Another noteworthy facility in Forsmark is the static inverter of HVDC Fenno-Skan, just west of the nuclear power plant.

Because of the sensitive instruments  for detecting local leaks of radioactivity, the nuclear power plant was the first place outside the Soviet Union where signs of the Chernobyl accident were detected on April 27, 1986. When workers at the plant were found to carry radioactive particles, the origin of the leak was investigated and it eventually became clear that the contamination came from the atmosphere rather than from the Forsmark plant itself.

History
Forsmark formerly had an ironworks producing oregrounds iron.

External links 
Forsmark kraftgrupp (Forsmark Powergroup), page also available in English.

Populated places in Uppsala County
Ironworks in Sweden